Edaphoceras is a genus of koninckioceratid nautilids from the Mississippian of North America, named by Hyatt, 1884, with depressed whorls just in contact. The shell, as typical for the family, is evolute; whorl section is fusiform with broadly rounded venter and dorsum meeting at a narrow angle on either side. Its suture has a distinct ventral and dorsal lobe and an angular lateral saddle. The siphuncle is small and near central.

References

 Bernhard Kummel, 1964.  Nautiloidea-Nautilida. Treatise on Invertebrate Paleontology, Part K. Geological Soc. of America and University of Kansas press. Teichert and Moore (eds) 
Koninckioceratidae-Paleodb

Prehistoric nautiloid genera